Bicycle law in California is the parts of the California Vehicle Code that set out the law for persons cycling in California, and a subset of bicycle law in the United States. In general, pretty much all the same rights and responsibilities that apply to car drivers apply to bicycle riders as well.

General applicability of road rules 

CVC 21200 states that the rules of the road, set out in Division 11 of the California Vehicle Code, that do not specifically apply only to motor vehicles are applicable to cyclists. Police officers riding bicycles are exempt from the provisions when they are responding to an emergency call, engaged in rescue operations, or in immediate pursuit of a suspect.

Locations of cycling

On-road 
CVC 21650 sets the on-road position for all vehicles, including bicycles.

21650(g) clarifies that bicycles are not prohibited from riding on sidewalks or crosswalks but does allow for local ordinance to prohibit such operation.

It is not illegal for bicycles to ride on the sidewalk in a direction opposing the flow of traffic. However, doing so is quite dangerous.

CVC 21650.1 clarifies that cyclists, unlike drivers of vehicles, are generally not prohibited from riding on the shoulder of the road.

Cyclists are allowed but never required to ride on the shoulder. CVC 530 defines the "roadway" as "that portion of a highway improved, designed, or ordinarily used for vehicular travel". The on-road position of cyclists is narrowed by CVC 21202, which requires riding "as close as practicable to the right-hand curb or edge of the roadway" except in certain circumstances.

The wording shall ride as close as practicable to the right is sometimes misunderstood by police officers as well as cyclists.

CVC Section 21960 authorizes local authorities to prohibit or restrict the use of bicycles on freeways.

Where bike lanes exist on roadways, CVC 21208 requires cyclists to use them, except under certain conditions.  There is no requirement to ride in a bike lane or path that is not on the roadway.

There is no requirement in the California Vehicle Code, but side-by-side riding may be regulated by local ordinance.

Off-road 

CVC 21100 sets out that "Local authorities may adopt rules and regulations... regarding the ... Operation of bicycles, and, as specified in Section 21114.5, electric carts by physically disabled persons, or persons 50 years of age or older, on the public sidewalks." Under this provision, many California cities have banned sidewalk cycling in business districts.

Movement

CVC 22107 requires cyclists to yield and signal before moving left or right.

CVC 21656 specifies that slow-moving vehicles causing a queue of five or more vehicles behind them must turn off the roadway in order to allow the vehicles behind to pass them. Section 21202 explicitly states that cyclists are "subject to the provisions of Section 21656".

CVC 21760 requires motor vehicles to leave a 3-foot margin while passing a cyclist if possible.

Cyclist's Duties to Other Cyclists, Pedestrians, Runners, and Self 

It is arguably legal for cyclists to race each other on open public roads in California if that is safe at the time under the circumstances.  In traffic, or where visibility is limited (rain, fog, wooded areas, curvy roads), racing would be arguably negligent and unlawful. CVC 21200(a), provides: "Every person riding a bicycle upon a highway... is subject to all the provisions applicable to the driver of a vehicle by this division... except those provisions which by their very nature can have no application." Under the common law in California, all vehicle operators (including bike operators) have a general duty to use reasonable care to avoid collisions with other cyclists, cars, runners and pedestrians,  since it is not the case that runners and pedestrians (for example) are always prohibited by the CVC from sharing a bike lane.

Miscellaneous

Equipment requirements 
A bicycle ridden on public roads must have a brake on at least one wheel which can make the wheel skid on dry pavement.

CVC 21201 (d) 
A bicycle operated during darkness upon a highway, a sidewalk where bicycle operation is not prohibited by the local jurisdiction, or a bikeway... shall be equipped with all of the following
 White or yellow reflectors visible from on the bike's pedals or the cyclist's feet or ankles.
 A white or yellow reflector on each side of the bike's front half.
 A white or red reflector on each side of the bike's back half.

Bicycle helmets for minors 
CVC 21212 requires cyclists under the age of 18 to wear helmets. The charge can be dismissed if the person charged declares under oath that it is their first violation of this section. Otherwise, the infraction is punishable by a fine not more than $25. Parents will be held liable for the fine.

Under CVC 21100(a) local authorities may adopt ordinances for the purpose of "Regulating or prohibiting processions or assemblages on the highways."

Riding under the influence 
CVC 21200.5 prohibits riding a bicycle while under the influence of alcohol and/or drugs.

Possibility of licensing 

CVC 39002 allows local authorities to implement mandatory licensing for bicycles and prohibit riding of unlicensed bicycles.

See also 
 Law of California
 Outline of cycling

Notes

References

External links
 California Vehicle Code

Cycling in California
California law
Utility cycling